The Ngaoundéré Central Station (Gare centrale de Ngaoundéré in French) is the main railway station in Ngaoundéré, Cameroon. It is located on the Yaoundé-Bélabo-Ngaoundéré line of the Camrail network.

The station was opened on December 10, 1974. It was extensively renovated in 2012, at a cost of around two billion CFA francs. This renovation added 22 benches, 16 lamps, toilet blocks, commercial buildings, the installation of tiles and the construction of offices for the Commissioner of Railways.

The station serves as a discharge point for fresh foods which are then loaded into trucks for transport to points in the north of the country and in Chad. While a true dry port, the railway station in Ngaoundere lacks the appropriate infrastructure for the storage of fresh food. The food items are left in the open air, close to other types of goods, regardless of the type.

See also 
 Rail transport in Cameroon
 Railway stations in Cameroon
 Transport in Cameroon

References

Railway stations in Cameroon
Railway stations opened in 1974
1974 establishments in Cameroon
Adamawa Region